Jovičić or Jovicic is a Serbian surname derived from a masculine given name Jovica. Notable people with the surname include:

 Risto Jovičić (1814-1883), Bosnian Serb freedom fighter and merchant.
 Branko Jovičić (born 1993), Serbian footballer
 Đorđe Jovičić
 Igor Jovičić (born 1964), first and last Secretary General of Serbia and Montenegro
 Jovan Jovičić (1926-2013), Serbian physicist and musician
 Robert Jovicic (born 1966)
  (born 1956), president of the World Diasporas and Minorities Organization (WDMO)
 Zoran Jovičić (born 1973), Serbian footballer
 Milorad Z. Jovičić (1868-1937), Serbian chemist

Serbian surnames